Sindh TV News (brandmarked Sindh TV) or Sindh Television News is a Sindhi television channel. It's a news channel which telecast news, news reports and current affair programs. The management of Dolphin Media House announced to launch a news channel and its testing transmission was started in October 2004. The channel did cover historical and archaeological sites of Sindh and other sites in Pakistan, so it was considered as a first documentary TV channel of Pakistan. Notable Sindhi journalists such as Ishaq Manrio, Hassan Dars, Bukhshan Mehranvi and Imdad Soomro did cover the documentary programmes. The owners of the channel are Dr.Karim Rajpar and Ajeet Kumar Ahuja.

Sindh TV 

The network's channel entertainment, current affairs and news.

Reporters 
 Ghulam Rasool Chandio (Bureau Chief Hyderabad)
 Attaullah Rajar (Bureau Chief Islamabad)
 Nadir Ali(Bureau Chief Lahore)
 Shaukat Noonari (Bureau Chief Sukkur)
 Hakeem Sethar (Bureau Chief Quetta)
 Hakim Ali Kumbhar (Cameraman & Editor Quetta 2005 )
 Khaled Chandio (Hyderabad)
 Azhar Gul Sarki (Bureau Chief Jacobabad)

District reporters 

Sindh TV News has wide presence all over the province of Sindh, its network of reporters is present in all district headquarters of Sindh, to smaller towns and cities of the province. Sindh TV also maintains a bureau office in other major cities of Pakistan which includes capital Islamabad, Quetta and Lahore.

 Ghulam Rasool Chandio (Bureau Chief Hyderabad)
 Attaullah Rajar (Bureau Chief Islamabad)
 Nadir Ali(Bureau Chief Lahore)
 Shaukat Noonari (Bureau Chief Sukkur)
 Javed Langa (Bureau Chief Quetta)
 Hakim Ali Kumbhar (Cameraman & Editor Quetta Off )
 Khaled Chandio (Hyderabad) Azhar Gul Sarki (Bureau Chief Jacobabad)
 Ghulam Mustfe Memon ( Golarchi )
 Younis Malkani ( Malkani Shareef )
 Asad Ali Jogi (Reporter Thari Mirwah)

In November 2006 transmission was suspended by the Government of Pakistan. Transmission was resumed later that month after demonstrations in Sindh. The network has over 2,000 employees and freelance contributors.

See also
 Sindh TV
 Awaz Television Network
 Kawish Television Network
 List of Sindhi-language television channels

References

External links

Television stations in Pakistan
Television networks in Pakistan
Television channels and stations established in 2004
Mass media in Sindh
Sindhi-language mass media